Thomas William Appelquist is a theoretical particle physicist who is the Eugene Higgins Professor of Physics at Yale University.

He received his bachelor's degree from Illinois Benedictine College and his Ph.D. in 1968 from Cornell University under Donald R. Yennie with thesis Parametric Representations of Renormalized Feynman Amplitudes. In 1970, following a postdoctoral appointment at the Stanford Linear Accelerator Center, he joined the faculty at Harvard University. In 1975, he moved to Yale and was appointed Professor of Physics in 1976. From 1983 until 1989, he served as Chair of the Yale Department of Physics. He served as Director of the Division of Physical Sciences and Engineering from 1990 to 1993. In 1991, he was named Eugene Higgins Professor of Physics, and from 1993 to 1998 he served as Dean of the Yale Graduate School.
 
He is a Fellow of the American Physical Society (elected in 1984), the recipient of a Senior U.S. Scientist award from the Alexander von Humboldt Foundation, and a Fellow of the American Academy of Arts and Sciences. In 1997, he was awarded the J.J. Sakurai Prize of the American Physical Society for his work on charmonium and the de-coupling of heavy particles.
 
From 1993 to 1996, he served as President of the Aspen Center for Physics. He has served on many advisory committees for the National Science Foundation, the Department of Energy and the American Physical Society. From 1989 to 1993, he was a member of the Scientific Policy Committee of the Superconducting Supercollider (SSC) Laboratory. At Yale, during the 1992-1993 academic year, he served on the faculty/trustee Presidential Search Committee. From 1999-2001, he chaired the committee of the National Research Council that prepared an Overview of the field of physics as the culmination of the NRC survey “Physics in a New Era”. From 2001-2006, he served as Chairman of the Board of the Aspen Center for Physics. He chaired the Science Council of the Jefferson National Laboratory in Newport News, Virginia from 2007 to 2017.  
 
His research has focused on the theory of elementary particles, including the strong interactions and electroweak unification.

References

Particle physicists
21st-century American physicists
J. J. Sakurai Prize for Theoretical Particle Physics recipients
Benedictine University alumni
Cornell University alumni
Yale University faculty
Fellows of the American Academy of Arts and Sciences
Fellows of the American Physical Society
Living people
1941 births